Natterer's slaty antshrike (Thamnophilus stictocephalus) is a species of bird in the family Thamnophilidae. It is found in northern Bolivia (Beni Department and Santa Cruz Department) and Brazil (in the southern Amazon between the Tocantins River, Xingu, Tapajós, and Madeira Rivers). It was previously included in the widespread slaty antshrike (T. punctatus), but following the split, this scientific name is now restricted to the northern slaty antshrike.

Its natural habitats are subtropical or tropical dry forests and subtropical or tropical moist lowland forests.

Natterer's slaty antshrike was described by the Austrian ornithologist August von Pelzeln in 1868 and given its current binomial name Thamnophilus stictocephalus.

References

Natterer's slaty antshrike
Birds of the Amazon Basin
Natterer's slaty antshrike
Taxonomy articles created by Polbot